Carsten Träger (born 25 October 1973) is a German politician of the Social Democratic Party (SPD) who has served as a member of the Bundestag from the state of Bavaria since 2013.

Political career 
Träger first became a member of the Bundestag in the 2013 German federal election. He is a member of the Committee on Food and Agriculture and the Committee on the Environment, Nature Conservation and Nuclear Safety. Since 2018, he has been his parliamentary group's spokesperson on environmental policy.

In addition to his committee assignments, Träger has been a member of the German delegation to the Franco-German Parliamentary Assembly since 2019. Since 2022, he has been one of the founding members of a cross-party group promoting a One Health approach.

In the negotiations to form a coalition government under the leadership of Chancellor Angela Merkel following the 2017 federal elections, Träger was part of the working group on energy, climate protection and the environment, led by Armin Laschet, Georg Nüßlein and Barbara Hendricks.

In the negotiations to form a so-called traffic light coalition of the SPD, the Green Party and the Free Democratic Party (FDP) following the 2021 federal elections, Träger was part of his party's delegation in the working group on environmental policy, co-chaired by Rita Schwarzelühr-Sutter, Steffi Lemke and Stefan Birkner.

Other activities 
 German Foundation for Consumer Protection (DSV), Member of the Board of Trustees (since 2022)
 Nuclear Waste Disposal Fund (KENFO), Member of the Board of Trustees (since 2022)
 German Federal Environmental Foundation (DBU), Member of the Board of Trustees (since 2019)
 International Academy for Nature Conservation (INA), Member of the Advisory Board

References

External links 

  
 Bundestag biography 

1973 births
Living people
Members of the Bundestag for Bavaria
Members of the Bundestag 2021–2025
Members of the Bundestag 2017–2021
Members of the Bundestag 2013–2017
Members of the Bundestag for the Social Democratic Party of Germany
People from Fürth